John E. Twomey (born March 2, 1923) is an American track and field athlete, who competed in the 1951 Pan American Games.

Life and career
Twomey was born on March 2, 1923, and originated from Roseville, Illinois. He attended Roseville High School, where he managed the basketball team, before attending the University of Illinois, where he graduated in 1941. Twomey served in the U.S. Army Air Corps during World War II, from 1943 to 1945. He worked as a corn farmer, and was a member of the Illinois Athletic Club.

Twomey tried out for the 1948 Summer Olympics, but fell just short of being selected. In 1951 Twomey won the silver medal in the 5000 metres event and the bronze medal in the 1500 metres competition.

As of 2014, Twomey was still giving presentations about track and field athletics, at the age of 90.

References

External links
John Twomey profile at Track and Field Statistics

1923 births
Living people
American male middle-distance runners
American male long-distance runners
Pan American Games track and field athletes for the United States
Athletes (track and field) at the 1951 Pan American Games
Pan American Games silver medalists for the United States
Pan American Games bronze medalists for the United States
Pan American Games medalists in athletics (track and field)
Medalists at the 1951 Pan American Games
20th-century American people